

Norbert Holm (16 December 1895 – 3 June 1962) was a general in the Wehrmacht of Nazi Germany during World War II. He was a recipient of the Knight's Cross of the Iron Cross. Following the 20 July plot, on 16 September 1944, Norbert Holm was arrested and later demoted because of his Chief of Operations association with Field Marsal Erwin Rommel. He fought as a private in the 19th Panzer Division, and for "repeated bravery before the enemy" he was promoted to Unteroffizier in January 1945 and to Feldwebel two months before the end of the war. He was rehabilitated in 1956.

Awards and decorations

 Knight's Cross of the Iron Cross on 20 December 1941 as Oberst and commander of Infanterie-Regiment 156 (mot.)

References

Citations

Bibliography

 

1895 births
1962 deaths
Major generals of the German Army (Wehrmacht)
Military personnel from Hamburg
German Army personnel of World War I
Recipients of the clasp to the Iron Cross, 1st class
Recipients of the Knight's Cross of the Iron Cross
German Army generals of World War II